This is an alphabetical list of notable Punjabi singers. These vocal artists are from the Indian and Pakistani state of Punjab; some belong to the immigrant population living abroad in the United Kingdom, North America and Africa.

A
Abrar-ul-Haq
 Abida Parveen
 Attaullah Khan Esakhelvi
Asa Singh Mastana
Amar Singh Chamkila
Ali Zafar
 Atif Aslam 
 Amanat Ali
 Amrinder Gill
 Akhil
 Angrej Ali
 Aman Hayer
 Alam Lohar
 AP Dhillon
 AR Paisley
 Arif Lohar
 Arjan Dhillon
 Ahmed Rushdi
 Abida Parveen 
 Azra Jehan
 Amrit Maan
 Ammy Virk
 Amar Arshi
 Amar Noorie

B
Babbu Maan
Bhagwant Maan
Bally Sagoo
 Bohemia
 Benjamin Sisters
Baljit Malwa
Balkar Sidhu
 Babbal Rai
 Baba Sehgal
Bikram Singh
Bilal Saeed
B Praak

C 
Channi Singh

D

Daler Mehndi
 Dilshad Akhtar
 Dev Dhillon
 Diljit Dosanjh
Didar Sandhu
 Dr Zeus
 Deep Jandu
 Dharampreet
 Durga Rangila

F 
 Fariha Pervez
 Farida Khanum
 Fateh Doe

G
Gurdas Maan
Gurmeet Bawa
 Gurnam Bhullar
 Ghulam Ali
 Gippy Grewal
Gurshabad
 Guru Randhawa
 Garry Sandhu
 Gur Sidhu
 Gurinder Gill

H
Harbhajan Maan
 Hadiqa Kiani
Hardy Sandhu
Honey Singh
Happy Raikoti
H-Dhami
Hans Raj Hans
Harjit Harman
Harshdeep Kaur
Himanshi 
 Humaira Channa
 Hakam Sufi

I 
 Inayat Hussain Bhatti
 Imran Khan
 Inderjit Nikku

J
 Jagmohan Kaur
 Jasbir Jassi
 Jasmine Sandlas
 Jaswinder Brar
 Jass Bajwa
 Jass Manak
Jassa Dhillon
 Jawad Ahmad
 Jaz Dhami
 Jazzy B 
 Juggy D
 Jassie Gill
Jagjit Singh
 Jay Sean
 Jaspinder Narula
 Jassi Sidhu
 Jordan Sandhu

K
 Kaka
 Kamal Heer
 Kanth Kaler
 Kamal Khan
 Kuldeep Manak
 Kulwinder Dhillon
 Karamjit Anmol
 Karan Aujla
 Kanika Kapoor
 Kiran Ahluwalia
 Karnail Gill
 K S Makhan
 Kamaljit Neeru
 Karnail Singh Paras
 Kulwinder Billa

L

 Labh Janjua
 Lakhwinder Wadali
 Lehmber Hussainpuri
 Lal Chand Yamla Jatt

M
 Manni Sandhu
 Mohammad Rafi
 Mohammad Sadiq
 Manmohan Waris
Mehdi Hassan
 Mala
 Mehnaz
 Miss Pooja
 Master Saleem
 Malkit Singh
Mickey Singh
 Masood Rana
 Musarrat Nazir
 Maninder Buttar

N
Nusrat Fateh Ali Khan
Naheed Akhtar
Nimrat Khaira
Nachhatar Gill
Narinder Biba
Noor Jehan
Nav
 Navv Inder
 Naseem Begum
 Ninja
 Nisha Bano
 Nachhatar Chhatta

P
Pammi Bai
 Panjabi MC
 Preet Brar
 Prem Dhillon
Preet Harpal

R
Raj Brar
Ranjit Bawa
Ranjit Kaur
Rahat Fateh Ali Khan
Roshan Prince
 Reshma
 Ravinder Grewal

S
Satinder Sartaaj
Sunanda Sharma
Surinder Kaur
 Surjit Bindrakhia
 Sangtar
Satwinder Bitti
 Sahir Ali Bagga
 Sajjad Ali
 Surj Sahota
 Sarbjit Cheema
 Shaukat Ali
 Surjit Khan
 Shazia Manzoor
 Satinder Satti 
 Sukshinder Shinda 
 Saleem Raza
 Surinder Shinda 
 Sardool Sikander
 Shanno Khurana
 Sukhwinder Singh 
 Sukhbir
 Saieen Zahoor
 Sukhwinder Panchhi
 Sharry Maan
 Sidhu Moosewala
 Shubh
 Shinda Kahlon

T
Tarsem Jassar
Tarsame Singh Saini
Tegi Pannu
The PropheC
Tufail Niazi

V 

 Veronica Mehta

Y 
Yo Yo Honey Singh
Yuvraj Hans

Z 

 Zubaida Khanum

References

Punjabi
+